Alexander Militarev  (born January 14, 1943) is a Russian scholar of Semitic, Berber, Canarian and Afroasiatic (Afrasian, Semito-Hamitic) languages, comparative-historical linguistics, Jewish and Bible studies at the Russian State University for the Humanities.

Linguistic studies 
As a linguist, Militarev is particularly known for his novel and disputable genealogical classification of the said linguistic entities relying on lexicostatistics; for the chronology of their branching relying on Sergei Starostin’s method in glottochronology; and for his endeavor to build up a comprehensive picture of the West Asian Early Neolithic society with its material and intellectual culture based on the reconstructed and dated common Afrasian lexicon.

Militarev authors five books and around a hundred twenty publications on a wide range of linguistic, historical, Jewish and biblical subjects. He is a grandson of Solomon Maizel (1900-1952), a prominent Russian orientalist, linguist and polyglot, expert in comparative Semitic, Arabic, Hebrew, Turkish and Iranian; Maizel’s working draft of his second dissertation “Пути развития корневого фонда семитских языков” (“Ways of Root Derivation in Semitic”) was published in 1983 by Militarev with his introduction, supplements and glossary (in Russian). Militarev was a co-worker of outstanding Russian and international scholars Igor Diakonoff and Sergei Starostin and considers himself their continuator and informal disciple.

Multiple research projects headed by Militarev have been supported by various Russian and US foundations. In 2006, he was nominated by a group of US, European and Russian professors for the Holberg International Memorial Prize. Full professor (since 2004) of the Institute of Oriental and Classic Studies, Russian State University for the Humanities in Moscow, Militarev is now a consulting professor at the same Institute. In 2005-2008, professor at the Dept. of Jewish Studies, Institute of Asian and African Studies, Moscow State Lomonosov University. In 1994-2009, he was elected for four consecutive terms president of the Jewish University in Moscow (in 2002-2009, renamed into Shimon Dubnov Advanced School in the Humanities). Militarev has run the Afrasian section of the Evolution of Human Languages (EHL) project at the Santa Fe Institute.  He has been a guest lecturer in top European, US, and Israeli universities and research centers. Militarev is a founding member of the International Association for Comparative Semitics (Barcelona).

Militarev is the leading linguistic proponent of the Levantine origin for Afrasian (“Levant theory”, opposed to Afroasiatic Urheimat in Northeast Africa theory proposed by Christopher Ehret, Roger Blench and others) linking the proto-Afrasian speakers to the Levantine Natufian culture. He co-authors with Leonid Kogan two volumes of the ground-breaking Semitic Etymological Dictionary, which received highly favorable reviews. Militarev also compiled the genealogical tree of world languages, including tentative dates of their branching obtained glottochronologically, based on research by the Moscow School of Comparative Linguistics including his own research on Afrasian dated by him to the 10th millennium B.C.E. He initiated interdisciplinary meetings of historical linguists, archaeologists, pre-historians,  and anthropologists by convening in Moscow national and international conferences “Linguistic Reconstruction and Prehistory of the East” (1984 and 1989), which triggered a series of international conferences, more recently involving geneticists, targeting the problems of prehistoric chronology, human migrations, correlation of  homelands of the speakers of proto-languages with certain archaeological cultures,  and dispersal of cultural innovations.

In the most recent studies, Militarev has obtained an earlier date for Proto-Afrasian, namely the mid-11th millennium B.C.E., which is supposed to be more grounded, as this time his lexicostatistical and glottochronological analysis of 100 most stable words of Swadesh list was applied to many more (170) languages representing all Afrasian branches, groups and subgroups, and consistently includes the etymological background of every item whenever possible. In Militarev's scenario, Proto-Afrasian split into South Afrasian, diverging in the 9th millennium into Cushitic and Omotic (with controversial Ongota a separate sub-branch of the latter) and North Afrasian splitting also in the 9th millennium into Semitic and North African Afrasian falling in the early 7th millennium into Egyptian and Chadic-Berber diverging into Chadic and Berber-Canarian in the late 6th millennium. His updated analysis of 100-word standard Swadesh list applied to over 30 Semitic languages mainly corroborated his previous unorthodox genealogical classification according to which Proto-Semitic split between 4,800-4,700 B.C.E. into South Semitic (represented by Modern South Arabian) and North Semitic falling about a thousand years later into Akkadian and West Semitic branching in early 3rd millennium B.C.E. into Proto-Ethiopian (dividing on the verge of 2nd and 1st millennia B.C.E. into North and South Ethiopian), Proto-Arabic, and Proto-Levantine falling between 2,400 and 2,300 B.C.E. into Ugaritic and South Levantine branching on the verge of 3rd and 2nd millennia B.C.E. into Aramaic, Epigraphic South Arabian (represented in the analysis by Sabaic) and Canaanite represented by Hebrew and Phoenician separated between 15th and 14th centuries B.C.E. Militarev conjectures that the dates obtained may be compatible with both the known historical events, archaeological dating and even internal biblical chronology.

Jewish studies 

While Militarev’s works on linguistic subjects are widely quoted and discussed in both professional and amateur milieux, his book “The Jewish Conundrum in World History” (Academic Studies Press. Boston, 2010) passed nearly unnoticed though, in the annotation, it received a high appraisal from two top American experts in Jewish studies:

"This remarkable and thought-provoking work, by one of the leading figures in the scholarly revival of Jewish studies in the former Soviet Union is a sustained reflection on the course of Jewish history and of the impact of the Jews over the past millennia on wider developments. It is one of the most fascinating reflections on this vital topic to appear in recent times." Antony Polonsky, Albert Abramson Professor of Holocaust Studies, Brandeis University and the United States Holocaust Memorial Museum.

"A Russian-educated linguist and cultural anthropologist, Alexander Militarev offers in this elegantly written study a novel approach to address the “conundrum” posed by the prominence of the Jews in the unfolding of humanistic cosmopolitan culture. With prodigious erudition, yet with manifest humanity and no small measure of humor, he probes the deep structures of what he calls the “Adamic universalism” inscribed in the biblical lexicon and worldview and which, he argues, continue to inform the cognitive reflexes and ethical sensibilities of Jewish intellectuals." Paul Mendes-Flohr, Professor of Modern Jewish Thought, Divinity School, The University of Chicago and Professor Emeritus, The Hebrew University of Jerusalem.

Poetry 

Apart from scholarly subjects, Militarev authors three books of poetry in Russian and translations of poetry from English and Spanish into Russian (by Emily Dickinson, Edgar Allan Poe, Miguel Hernandez and other poets). He also translated 54 of Shakespeare’s sonnets into Russian.

Selected works 

 1983. Introduction, supplements and glossary in the book: S. S. Maizel "Ways of Root Derivation in Semitic". Moscow, 104 pp.
 1984. Igor Diakonoff. Afterword and notes to the Russian edition of the book: H.Lhote  "Vers d'autres Tassilis. Nouvelles decouvertes au Sahara". Leningrad, p. 190-208.
 1984. Co-authored with V.Shnirelman. Towards the problem of locating the early Afrasian speakers. Preprints of the 1st National Conference "Language Reconstruction and Prehistory of the Orient", Moscow. part 2, p. 35-53. 
 1984. Comparative-historical Afrasian studies today: what light can they throw on the prehistory? Ibid., part 3, p. 3-26. 
 1984. Co-authored with Sergei Starostin. Common Afrasian and North Caucasian cultural lexicon. Ibid., part 3, p. 34-43.
 1986. On the origin of terms conveying the notion of creation in Afroasiatic. Written Monuments and Problems of Cultural History of the Orient, Issue 3, Moscow, p. 63-79.
 1989. Tamahaq Tuaregs in the Canary Islands (Linguistic Evidence). Aula Orientalis, No.6, Barcelona, pp. 195–209.
 1994-1997. Co-authored with I. Diakonoff et al. Historical-Comparative Vocabulary of Afroasiatic. St.Petersburg Journal of African Studies. Nos. 2-6.
 2002. The prehistory of a dispersal: the Proto-Afrasian (Afroasiatic) farming lexicon. Examining the Farming/Language Dispersal Hypothesis, eds. P. Bellwood & C. Renfrew. (McDonald Institute Monographs.) Cambridge: McDonald Institute for Archaeological Research, pp. 135–50.
 2000. Co-authored with Leonid Kogan. Semitic Etymological Dictionary. Vol. I. Anatomy of Man and Animals. Münster: Ugarit-Verlag.
 2005. Co-authored with Leonid Kogan. Semitic Etymological Dictionary. Vol. II. Animal Names. Münster: Ugarit-Verlag.
 2005. Co-authored with G.Kurtik. Once more on the origin of Semitic and Greek star names: an astronomic-etymological approach updated. "Culture and Cosmos", Vol. 9, No. 1,  pp.3–43.
 2005. Once more about glottochronology and comparative method: the Omotic-Afrasian case. Aspects of comparative linguistics - 1. FS S. Starostin. Orientalia et Classica VI. Moscow, pp. 339–408.
 2005.Towards the genetic affiliation of Ongota, a nearly-extinct language of Ethiopia (I).  Orientalia et Classica VIII. Papers of the Institute of Oriental and Classical Studies. Babel  and Bibel 2. Annual of Ancient Near East, Old Testament and Semitic Studies (Memoriae Igor  M. Diakonoff). Winona Lake, Indiana, pp. 567–607. 	
 2006. Towards the genetic affiliation of Ongota, a nearly-extinct language of Ethiopia (II).  Orientalia et Classica XIV. Papers of the Institute of Oriental and Classical Studies. Babel and Bibel 3. Ancient Near East, Old Testament and Semitic Studies. Moscow, pp. 489–512.
 2009. Reconstructed lexicon for the West Asian home of Proto-Afrasians: pastoralism. Journal of Language Relationship, № 1, pp. 95–106.
 2009. Homo Tardus (The Late Man), Moscow: Criterion (collection of poetry and translations of poetry).
 2010. The Jewish Conundrum in World History. Boston: Academic Studies Press.
 2013. The importance of external lexical comparison for today’s comparative Semitics and the main problems and immediate tasks of Afrasian comparative linguistics. Archaism and Innovation in the Semitic Languages. Selected Papers. Edited by Juan Pedro Monferrer-Sala & Wilfred G. E. Watson. Cordoba: CNERU–DTR–Oriens Academic, pp. 87–92.
 2014. A complete etymology-based hundred wordlist of Semitic updated: Items 75–100. Journal of Language Relationship 11, 159–186.
 2015. Etymology-based 100-item wordlist of Semitic languages: addenda and conclusions. Journal of Language Relationship 13, 100–147.
 2015. Афразийская макросемья. Г. С. Старостин (при участии А. В. Дыбо, А. Ю. Милитарёва, И. И. Пейроса). К истокам языкового разнообразия, стр. 314-383. Moscow. Afroasiatic Macro-family. In: G.S.Starostin (with participation of A.V.Dybo, A.Yu.Militarev and I.I.Peiros). To the Origins of Language Diversity, p. 314-383. 
 2016. Переводы 52 сонетов Шекспира. Уильям Шекспир. Сонеты (Translations of 52 sonnets by Shakespeare.  Shakespeare. Sonnets), серия «Литературные памятники». М.
 2017. The Hebrew Bible: long memory of the people, “feel of history” and the concept of progress. Хазарский альманах, М., 2017. – Т. 15., c. 13-16.
 2018. Этимология для древней и древнейшей истории ближневосточно-северноафриканско-средиземноморского ареала. Academia.edu, Researchgate, 2018, 20 pp.
 2018. Немейнстримовские соображения по поводу библейского повествования о “сынах Израиля” в Египте (о возможностях сравнительно-исторического языкознания в реконструкции этнокультурной истории). Academia.edu, Researchgate, 2018, 72 pp.
 2018. Ответы рецензентам на статью «Немейнстримовские соображения…» Academia.edu, Researchgate,  16 pp.
 2018. Охота за древом (Hunt for the Tree), Moscow, Ridero Publications, 464 pp. (collection of poetry in Russian and translations in verse into Russian from English, incl. sonnets by W. Shakespeare and poems by E.A.Poe, E.Dickinson, R.Kipling and 20th century American, Spanish, incl. M.Hernandez, and Newar poets).
 2019. Этимология и лексическая реконструкция для древней и древнейшей истории ближневосточно-северноафриканско-средиземноморского ареала.  Journal of Language Relationship • Вопросы языкового родства 17/3 (2019): 246-262.
 2020. Libyo-Berbers – Tuaregs – Canarians: Linguistic Evidence. Études et Documents Berbères 43: 131–158. 
 2020. Ancient Egyptian – Arabic contacts in lexicon: clue to Arabic Urheimat? Orientalistica. 2020;3(3): 783–798.
 2020. Inscriptions in Libyan Script in the Libyan Desert and the Island of Ferro: Background and Experiment in Reading. Études et Documents Berbères 44: 57–108.
 2020. Co-authored with Sergei Nikolaev. Proto-Afrasian names of ungulates in light of the Proto-Afrasian homeland issue. Journal of Language Relationship • Вопросы языкового родства 18/3 (2020): 199–226.
 2021. Лексическая реконструкция для реконструкции предыстории: праафразийские термины, относящиеся к оружию, войне и другим вооруженным конфликтам. Этнографическое обозрение. 2021. № 4. С. 5–23. https://doi.org/10.31857/S086954150016695-4
 2021. От поиска прародины до проблем семантической реконструкции: ответ оппонентам.  Этнографическое обозрение. 2021. № 4, С. 63-78.
 2021. Lexical Reconstruction for the Reconstruction of Prehistory: Proto-Afrasian Terms Related to Weaponry, Warfare and Other Armed Conflicts. Ethnographic Review 4. Pp. 237-252.
 2021. From the Search for an Original Afrasian Homeland to the Problems of Semantic Reconstruction: A Response to Commenters. Ethnographic Review 4. Pp. 284-297.
 2021. Fragments of the Canarian Etymological Dictionary. Études et Documents Berbères, 2021c, 45-46, pp. 285-298.
 2022. Reconstructing a cultural lexicon for pre-history: Berber zoonyms of Afrasian (Afro-Asiatic) origin. Asian and African Studies. Vol. 31, No. 1, 2022, pp. 1-47.

Works in honor of Alexander Militarev 

 2003. Studia Semitica. Orientalia. Papers of the Oriental Institute, issue III. Russian State University for the Humanities. Edited by Leonid Kogan. Moscow (Festschrift for A. Militarev).

References

 Ilya S. Smirnov. Alexander Yu. MILITAREV LX. Studia Semitica. Orientalia. Papers of the Oriental Institute, issue III (Ed. by Leonid Kogan). Moscow: Russian State University for the Humanities, 2003, pp. V-VII.

See also
 Afroasiatic languages
 Proto-Berber language
 Modern South Arabian languages
 Afroasiatic Urheimat

Living people
1943 births
20th-century linguists
21st-century linguists
Place of birth missing (living people)
Russian writers
Linguists of Afroasiatic languages
Paleolinguists
Natufian culture